Michael Wade Cole (born 3 September 1966) is an English former footballer who played for Ipswich Town, Port Vale, Fulham, and Chelmsford City in the 1980s and 1990s. A forward, he scored eight goals in 90 league games in a seven-year career in the Football League.

Career
Cole began his career at Ipswich Town, who finished 17th in the First Division in 1984–85 under Bobby Ferguson's stewardship. The "Blues" were then relegated in 1985–86, just one point behind the safety mark set by Leicester City. They reached the Second Division play-offs in 1986–87, where they were beaten by Charlton Athletic at the semi-final stage. New boss John Duncan dropped Cole from the first team and led the club to eighth position in 1987–88. Cole spent four weeks on loan at John Rudge's Port Vale from January to February 1988. He played four Third Division and three FA Cup games for the "Valiants", and scored one goal in a 3–2 win over York City at Bootham Crescent on 6 February. He returned to Ipswich from Vale Park, only to move permanently to Fulham. He had scored three goals in 38 league games during his time at Portman Road. Ray Lewington's "Cottagers" reached the Third Division play-offs in 1988–89, but were comfortably beaten by Bristol Rovers at the semi-final stage. However they dropped to just one point and one place above the relegation zone in 1989–90. They again struggled in 1990–91 under Alan Dicks's stewardship, finishing two points and one place above the relegation zone. Cole scored four goals in 48 league games in his three seasons at Craven Cottage. He later played Conference football for Chelmsford City.

Career statistics
Source:

References

1966 births
Living people
Footballers from Hillingdon
English footballers
Association football forwards
Ipswich Town F.C. players
Port Vale F.C. players
Fulham F.C. players
Chelmsford City F.C. players
English Football League players
National League (English football) players